Jang Yun-ho (born 25 August 1996) is a South Korean footballer who plays as a defensive midfielder for Gimpo FC in K League 2.

Career
Jang joined Jeonbuk Hyundai in 2015 and made his professional debut in a league match against Ulsan Hyundai on 17 June. He won the gold medal with the South Korea U-23 national team at the 2018 Asian Games.

Career statistics

Club

Honours

Club

Jeonbuk Hyundai Motors
K League 1 (3) : 2015, 2017, 2018
AFC Champions League (1) : 2016

International

South Korea U23
Asian Games: 2018

References

External links

1996 births
Living people
Association football midfielders
South Korean footballers
Jeonbuk Hyundai Motors players
Seoul E-Land FC players
Gimpo FC players
K League 1 players
K League 2 players
Footballers at the 2018 Asian Games
Asian Games medalists in football
Asian Games gold medalists for South Korea
Medalists at the 2018 Asian Games
South Korea under-23 international footballers